Urtext (from ur- "primordial" and text "text") may refer to:

 Urtext (biblical studies), the text that is believed to precede both the Septuagint and the Masoretic text
 Urtext edition, in classical music, the version of the music as it was created by the composer